Beth Salem Presbyterian Church is a historic African-American church in Athens, Tennessee.

The congregation was organized in 1866 with support from white missionaries, making Beth Salem the first African American church in the three-county farming region of McMinn, Meigs, and Polk counties.

At first, the congregation held its services under a brush arbor. After a local white woman donated land for a building, a log church was built. It also housed a public school. After the log building was destroyed by fire around 1920, the current building was built using donated lumber and the volunteer labor of both black church members and their white neighbors.

The 1920 church building is a one-story, one-room, rectangular frame structure with a gable front entrance, weatherboard siding, and a metal roof. It typifies a vernacular architectural tradition common in rural African-American churches during the Jim Crow era. It was added to the National Register of Historic Places in 2000.

References

Presbyterian churches in Tennessee
Churches on the National Register of Historic Places in Tennessee
Churches in McMinn County, Tennessee
Vernacular architecture in Tennessee
National Register of Historic Places in McMinn County, Tennessee